The Battle of the Jabara Valley occurred between 26 and 29 August 2019, during the Second Yemeni Civil War. It was part of the Operation Victory from God, a major Houthi-led offensive along the Saudi-Yemeni border.

The battle
A Saudi Arabian auxiliary force of around 1,100 men from the al-Fateh Brigade launched an offensive into the Jabara Valley in Yemen's Saada Governorate against Houthi forces. When the al-Fateh Brigade entered the valley, it was initially met with no resistance. A Houthi force then enveloped the Saudi aligned force and besieged it for four days. Saudi air support was ineffective at breaking the envelopment, with Houthi sources reporting that the Saudis accidentally struck their own positions with airstrikes. On 29 August 2019, a small breakout occurred with about 100 men from the pro-Saudi force escaping. The remaining thousand pro-Saudi troops capitulated, with approximately 1,000 to 2,000 killed or captured. The battle was part of the initial phase of Operation Victory from God.

Aftermath
Houthi sources reported that a Saudi airstrike killed several Yemeni prisoners of war captured during the battle.

The Houthis continued their offensive in course of September 2019.

References

Jabara Valley
2019 in Yemen
Jabara Valley
Jabara Valley
Yemeni Crisis (2011–present)
Jabara Valley
August 2019 events in Yemen
Saada Governorate